Ian Barney (born 15 February 1961) is a former speedway rider from England.

Speedway career 
Barney rode in the top two tiers of British Speedway from 1980 to 2003, riding for various clubs. In 1984, he became the National League Riders' Champion.

References 

Living people
1961 births
British speedway riders
Coventry Bees riders
Eastbourne Eagles riders
Exeter Falcons riders
King's Lynn Stars riders
Long Eaton Invaders riders
Peterborough Panthers riders
Sheffield Tigers riders